"When in Rome (Do the Jerk)" is a song by the American alternative rock band Rocket from the Crypt, released as the first single from their 1998 album RFTC. It was released as a shaped picture disc by Elemental Records, with the new songs "Tarzan" and "Tiger Feet Tonite" on the B-side. The single did not chart; in fact, of the three singles released from the album, only "Lipstick" managed to make the UK Singles Chart.

Track listing
"When in Rome (Do the Jerk)" - 3:57
"Tarzan" - 3:38
"Tiger Feet Tonite" - 2:15

Personnel
Speedo (John Reis) - guitar, lead vocals
ND (Andy Stamets) - guitar, backing vocals
Petey X (Pete Reichert) - bass, backing vocals
Apollo 9 (Paul O'Beirne) - saxophone, percussion, backing vocals
JC 2000 (Jason Crane) - trumpet, percussion, backing vocals
Atom (Adam Willard) - drums
Jim Dickinson - organ on "When in Rome (Do the Jerk)"
Kevin Shirley - recording, production, and mixing of "When in Rome (Do the Jerk)"
Mark Trombino - production and mixing of "Tarzan"

References 

1998 singles
Rocket from the Crypt songs
1998 songs
Song recordings produced by Kevin Shirley